The Tartan Army Sunshine Appeal is a Scottish charity that donates money to children's causes in locations where the Scottish National Football team play overseas matches.

History 
In 1999, a group of travelling football fans made a donation to support the purchase of a prosthetic limb for Kemal Karic, a boy who lost part of his lower leg as a result of a bomb blast in Bosnia during the Kosovo War. The organization was formally started in 2003 for the second donation in Lithuania.

Activities 
As of October 2021, donations totalling over $200,000 (£145,000) have been made in 88 countries. Primarily, donations are made to local children's healthcare and rehabilitation organisations. Donations are typically collected from travelling Scottish football fans and total £1,000 to £5,000.

The charity is non-religious and non-political.

Notable donations 

 1st donation,1999 Bosnia, prosthetic limb for Kemal Karic
 2nd donation, 2003 Lithuania
50th donation, Nigeria 
Jacksonville, Florida
Yokohama, Japan
Moldova, playground at a neurological hospital
Ukraine, medical care for children with impaired vision
Croatia, incubators for premature infants
Netherlands
2012 Belgium
64th donation 2017, Lithuania
2016 Malta
2017 Budapest, Hungary, orphanage
 87th donation, 2021 Faroe Islands
 88th donation, 2021 Moldova

Notable members 

 Neil Forbes, Chairman
 John Daly, former Chairman
 Craig Couper, Steering Group
 Jennifer Blackwood

References

External links 

 Scottish Charity Register page
 Tartan Army Sunshine Appeal official website

Organisations based in Glasgow
Organizations established in 1999
Sports organisations of the United Kingdom